Robert Pennock (December 14, 1936 - April 9, 2019) was a Progressive Conservative party member of the House of Commons of Canada. He was a contractor and businessman by career.

Pennock was elected at the Etobicoke North electoral district in the 1984 federal election and served in the 33rd Canadian Parliament, having defeated the incumbent Liberal Party MP, Roy MacLaren.  However, Pennock was defeated by MacLaren in the 1988 election.

Electoral record

External links
 

1936 births
2019 deaths
Members of the House of Commons of Canada from Ontario
Progressive Conservative Party of Canada MPs